Satan's Cheerleaders is a 1977 American comedy horror film directed by Greydon Clark and starring John Ireland, Yvonne De Carlo, and John Carradine.

Plot
Benedict High School's cheerleaders are not shy or sweet. The football team knows them well – and Billy, the school's disturbed janitor, would like to. In the locker room, the girls shower and dress, unaware of the eyes which secretly watch them. They do not know that a curse has been placed on their clothes and that their trip to the first big football game of the season might sideline them for eternity.

Cast
 John Ireland as The Sheriff
 Yvonne De Carlo as Emmy / Sheriff's Wife / High Priestess
 Jack Kruschen as Billy the Janitor
 John Carradine as The Bum
 Sydney Chaplin as Monk
 Jacqulin Cole as Ms. Johnson
 Kerry Sherman as Patti
 Hillary Horan as Chris
 Alisa Powell as Debbie
 Sherry Marks as Sharon
 Lane Cordell as Stevie
 Joseph Carlo as Coach
 Michael Donavan O'Donnell as Farmer
 Robin Greer as Baker Girl

Release
The film was released theatrically in the United States by Dimension Pictures in June 1977.

Home media
The film was released on VHS in the 1980s by various companies including Interglobal Home Video, Liberty Home Video, and United Video and on DVD by VCI Entertainment in 2002.  The DVD version was released by the VCI Home Video label from Music Video Distributors. A Blu-ray and DVD combo was released on November 7, 2017.

References

External links
 
 List of American films of 1977

American comedy horror films
1977 horror films
1977 films
1970s comedy horror films
Cheerleading films
American supernatural horror films
Films directed by Greydon Clark
Teensploitation
1977 comedy films
Dimension Pictures films
1970s English-language films
1970s American films